Upper Longdon is a village within the civil parish of Longdon and is in the District of Lichfield of the English county of Staffordshire.

Location 
Lichfield is located 6.1 miles to the south.

Facilities 
The village has one public house called the Chetwynd Arms located in the centre of the village on Upper Way.

Notable Features 
There is one listed building within the village called the Gables. The building is a pair of cottages thought to have been built around 1840. One of the outstanding features of the cottages are the ornamental fretted gable end barge boards.

See also
Listed buildings in Longdon, Staffordshire

References

External links
Longdon Parish - official site

Villages in Staffordshire
Lichfield District
Cannock Chase